Christine Barbe is a French winemaker based in Napa Valley, California. She is known for producing wine from Sauvignon blanc grapes in the Pessac-Léognan style.

Personal life and education

Christine Barbe was born in Bordeaux, France. She attended the Bordeaux Institute of Enology, where she received her Ph.D. in 1996 in Enology and Viticulture. She relocated, after graduation, to California in the United States.

Career

Barbe first started working in the wine industry in 1991 in France, while getting her Ph.D. She worked at Château Carbonnieux and Château La Louvière. Denis Dubourdieu was a mentor for Barbe, who taught her about Sauvignon blanc wine.  

Upon relocating to California, Barbe was hired by E & J Gallo Winery. She also worked at Robert Mondavi and Trinchero Family Estates. 

In 2006, she became winemaker for Cockerell Family Wine Estates. In 2009, she took on a larger management role at the company, but still retaining her winemaker title. At Cockerell, Barbe grows Sauvignon Blanc, Verdelho, Petite Sirah, and Tempranillo. She is best known for producing Sauvignon blanc wines in a style reminiscent of Bordeaux.

Barbe's own wine label, Toquade Wines, makes Sauvignon blanc wine. The word toquade, means "infatuation" or "craze" in French. She named the label Toquade as a tribute to her early experiences in the wine industry in France. Toquade's first vintage was in 2006 and consisted of 100 cases. The 2007 vintage produced 200 cases. The 2008 wine was made from fruit from a dry farmed single block vineyard in Yountville, California. The wine was fermented and aged in stainless steel tanks. It was aged for seven months. The 2010 production produced 450 cases.

References

External links
Official website for Toquade Wines
Interview with Christine Barbe

Businesspeople from Bordeaux
Oenologists
French viticulturists
French winemakers
French women scientists
French emigrants to the United States
Living people
Year of birth missing (living people)